Polan District is a district (bakhsh) in Chabahar County, Sistan and Baluchestan province, Iran. At the 2006 census, its population (including Talang Rural District, which was transferred to Qasr-e Qand County in 2013) was 43,050, in 8,416 families; excluding Talang Rural District, its population (as of 2006) was 28,799, in 5,352 families.  The district has one city: Polan. The district has one rural district (dehestan): Polan Rural District. At the 2016 census, the district's population had risen to 33,004.

References 

Chabahar County
Districts of Sistan and Baluchestan Province